Rettore may refer to:

 Magnifico Rettore, head of an Italian university
 Rector (politics)
 Rector (ecclesiastical), a cleric
 Donatella Rettore (born 1955), Italian singer and songwriter